The Polish National Badminton Championships is a tournament organized to crown the best badminton players in Poland. The tournament started in 1964.

Past winners

References
Badminton Europe - Details of affiliated national organisations
Polish Badminton Association Yearbook

Badminton tournaments in Poland
National badminton championships
Recurring sporting events established in 1964
Annual sporting events in Poland
1964 establishments in Poland
Badminton